Admiral Jonas Howard Ingram (October 15, 1887 – September 9, 1952) was an officer in the United States Navy during World War I and World War II. He commanded the United States Atlantic Fleet during World War II and was a recipient of the Medal of Honor for his actions in 1914 in Veracruz, Mexico.

Early life and sports

Playing career
As a youth, Ingram attended Jeffersonville High School and Culver Military Academy in Culver, Indiana, then was appointed to the United States Naval Academy in 1903, at the age of 17. During Ingram's time at the academy, he was a member of the school's rowing, track and football teams, leading the latter team to the Midshipmen's first victory in six years over their bitter rivals from Army by scoring the lone touchdown in the 1906 clash. His athletic exploits helped earn him the academy's prestigious Athletic Sword and induction into the College Football Hall of Fame in 1968.

Coaching career
As a lieutenant, Ingram was named the 15th head football coach of the United States Naval Academy and he held that position for two seasons, from 1915 until 1916, compiling a record of 9–8–2.

Military career
Following his graduation in 1907, Ingram served in several battleships, cruisers and destroyers. As turret officer of the battleship , he established a world's record for firing  guns. On April 22, 1914 he landed at Veracruz, Mexico with the Arkansas battalion and was later awarded the Medal of Honor for "distinguished conduct in battle" and "skillful and efficient handling of the artillery and machine guns".

World War I and interwar years
During World War I, Ingram was awarded the Navy Cross for his services on the staff of Rear Admiral Hugh Rodman, Commander, Division Nine, Battle Force, Atlantic Fleet.

Earning the rank of commander in 1924, Ingram became the commanding officer of the destroyer  before returning to the United States Naval Academy to serve as both athletic director and football director from 1926 to 1930.

Ingram moved on to command the battleship  for a period of time after that, before serving as Officer-in-Charge of the Public Relations Branch.

Prior to his promotion to captain in 1935, Ingram served as an aide to the Secretary of the Navy, then returned to the sea as commander of Destroyer Squadron Six. Ashore, he was Captain of the Yard, New York Navy Yard in Brooklyn, New York before returning to sea, in command of the battleship .

World War II
In the early years of World War II, Ingram was promoted to rear admiral on January 10, 1941 and served as Commander Task Force Three prior to his designation in September 1942 as Commander South Atlantic Force, United States Atlantic Fleet, with the rank of vice admiral. This force, with headquarters in Brazil, guarded shipping in the coastal waters south of the Equator and throughout the United States zone of responsibility in the South Atlantic. Ingram's command included air and surface units of Brazil which were brought to a high state of efficiency through his leadership and coordinating efforts. The ability to develop and maintain harmony and close cooperation with Brazilian naval forces contributed to the control of the South Atlantic achieved by the Allies. He assumed personal responsibility for properly equipping and training the Brazilian Navy and for their combat operations against U-Boats and German raiders and later for the important task of maintaining the air and sea rescue patrol for ultimate deployment in the Pacific. For his services in these important commands, he was awarded the Navy Distinguished Service Medal and a gold award star in lieu of a second award.

On November 15, 1944, Ingram was appointed Commander-in-Chief, United States Atlantic Fleet, with the rank of admiral. In this command he played a major role in assuring the steady flow of troops and materials to Europe across the Atlantic during the later phases of World War II. He also directed Atlantic Fleet efforts in containing and destroying the German U-Boat fleet. For exceptionally meritorious service during his command, he was awarded a gold award star in lieu of a third Distinguished Service Medal.

Retirement and last years
Detached from duty as Commander-in-Chief, United States Atlantic Fleet, during September 1946, he subsequently retired from active duty on April 1, 1947 after 44 years of service.

Ingram was named commissioner of the All-America Football Conference. Serving until resigning in 1949, Ingram went on to serve as a vice president for the Reynolds Metals Company.

In August 1952, Ingram suffered a heart attack while serving as the superintendent of summer schools at Culver Academies, then was stricken again with another attack on September 9, while at the United States Naval Hospital in San Diego, California. He died the following evening.

Admiral Ingram and his wife Jean Fletcher (1892–1954) are buried at Arlington National Cemetery, in Arlington, Virginia.

Medal of Honor citation
Rank and organization: Lieutenant, Junior Grade, U.S. Navy. Born: October 15, 1886, Jeffersonville, Ind. Accredited to: Indiana. G.O. No.: 177, December 4, 1915.

Citation
For distinguished conduct in battle, engagement of Vera Cruz, 22 April 1914. During the second day's fighting the service performed by him was eminent and conspicuous. He was conspicuous for skillful and efficient handling of the artillery and machineguns of the Arkansas battalion, for which he was specially commended in reports.

Additional awards
 Medal of Honor
 Navy Cross
 Navy Distinguished Service Medal with two award stars
 Purple Heart (for wounds received during an encounter with a German submarine "wolf-pack" in 1942)
 Mexican Service Medal
 World War I Victory Medal (United States) with "Grand Fleet" clasp
 American Defense Service Medal with bronze "A" device
 American Campaign Medal
 European-African-Middle Eastern Campaign Medal
 World War II Victory Medal

Ingram also held the following foreign decorations: Order of the Southern Cross (Brazil); Grand Officer of the Order of Military Merit (Brazil); Order of Naval Merit (Brazil); Order of Aeronautical Merit, Degree of Grand Officer (Brazil); Order of Leopold II (Belgium); and Knight Commander of the Order of the British Empire (Great Britain).

Legacy
The destroyer , commissioned in 1957, was named in his honor.

Head coaching record

See also

 List of Medal of Honor recipients (Veracruz)

References

External links
 
 

1886 births
1952 deaths
United States Army personnel of World War I
United States Navy World War II admirals
Recipients of the Navy Cross (United States)
United States Navy Medal of Honor recipients
Recipients of the Navy Distinguished Service Medal
Recipients of the Order of Military Merit (Brazil)
Recipients of the Order of Naval Merit (Brazil)
Honorary Knights Commander of the Order of the British Empire
Recipients of the Order of Leopold II
Navy Midshipmen athletic directors
Navy Midshipmen football coaches
Navy Midshipmen football players
College Football Hall of Fame inductees
People from Jeffersonville, Indiana
People of the Spanish–American War
United States Naval Academy alumni
United States Navy admirals
Battle of Veracruz (1914) recipients of the Medal of Honor
Culver Academies alumni
Burials at Arlington National Cemetery